The pandama is a mouth-veil worn by Mandaean men during baptismal ceremonial rituals. It is the lower end of a cloth wrapped around the mouth and lower face to protect from water during immersion. The upper end of the cloth is used as a turban (burzinqa).

In the Qolasta

Several prayers in the Qolasta are recited when putting on and loosening the pandama, including prayers 7 and 55.

See also

 Mandaean priest#Clothing
 Litham, a similar veil covering the lower face worn by Tuareg men
 Alasho, a similar turban veil worn by Hausa men

References 

Veils
Religious headgear
Shawls and wraps
Scarves
Mandaean clothing